2000 Malibu Road is an American prime time soap opera television series that aired on CBS during the summer from August 23 to September 9, 1992. The series stars Drew Barrymore, Jennifer Beals, Brian Bloom, Scott Bryce, Lisa Hartman, Tuesday Knight and Michael T. Weiss.

Plot 
The show deals with four women living together at a beach house located at 2000 Malibu Road: Jade (Lisa Hartman), a former prostitute trying to get out of the profession; Perry (Jennifer Beals), a young lawyer also escaping from her past (i.e. a slain fiancé police officer and a serious drinking problem); Lindsay (Drew Barrymore), a would-be actress trying to get the right break; and Joy (Tuesday Knight), Lindsay's overweight, overprotective, two-faced, manipulative sister, who also serves as her agent. Jade owns the house. In order to leave her profession as a high priced prostitute, she takes in roommates to help her pay for the house.

The series ends with several unresolved cliffhangers: Roger (Michael T. Weiss) is seen raping and beating Perry in a stairwell. Meanwhile, Porter's (Mitch Ryan) men shoot Hal (Robert Foxworth) dead, and after arguing with Lindsay upon discovering she was sleeping with Eric (Brian Bloom), Joy is struck by lightning. Lisa Hartman provided a closing narration to serve as a (perfunctory) tie-up for the characters, though possibly only on overseas broadcasts.

Cast 
Lisa Hartman as Jade O'Keefe
Drew Barrymore as Lindsay Rule
Jennifer Beals as Perry Quinn
Tuesday Knight as Joy Rule
Brian Bloom as Eric Adler
Scott Bryce as Scott Sterling
Michael T. Weiss as Roger Tabor
Ron Marquette as Sgt. Joe Munoz
Robert Foxworth as Hal Lanford
Constance Towers as Camilla
Mitch Ryan as Porter

Production 
The series was executive produced by Aaron Spelling, E. Duke Vincent, series creator Terry Louise Fisher, and Joel Schumacher, who also served as director.

Episodes 
Joel Schumaker directed at least the first five of the series' episodes.

Reception 
The series premiere earned decent ratings, but ratings fell from there and it was canceled after six episodes. According to executive producer Aaron Spelling, producers could not come to terms on license fees. However, Lisa Hartman had another version: as 2000 Malibu Road was facing Melrose Place in the same timeslot, Spelling was competing with himself and didn't want to weaken the ratings of Melrose Place.

References

External links 
 
 

1992 American television series debuts
1992 American television series endings
1990s American drama television series
American primetime television soap operas
CBS original programming
English-language television shows
Television series by CBS Studios
Television series by Spelling Television
Television shows set in Malibu, California